, born , was a popular Japanese recording artist and geisha. Her rivalry with another popular geisha singer, created the " Era" in Japanese music history.

Early life 
Ichimaru grew up in Japan with eleven siblings under harsh conditions. She left her family at the age of fourteen or fifteen to work at a geisha house. She spent much of her early years working at a hot springs spa in Asama, located in the Nagano Prefecture as an oshaku waitress. One time she was asked to sing by one of her customers, she was terribly embarrassed at her inability to sing and vowed to improve her skills.

At the age of nineteen she moved to Tokyo and joined the Ichimatsuya Okiya, and took on her new name, Asakusa Ichimaru.

Recording career 
In an effort to improve her singing skills when she moved to Tokyo, Ichimaru undertook shamisen and singing lessons from Enchiga Kiyomoto, who was a famous female shamisen artist. She made great progress but still felt she could get better. Ichimaru then undertook training with the Grand Head Master Enjudaiyu Kiyomoto V's son, Eijudaiyu.

The training paid off and soon she was in great demand in not only her own geisha district but others around hers such as Yanagibashi, Akasaka and Shinbashi. Due to her great singing talent, Ichimaru was asked by The Victor Recording Company to sign a contract in 1931, along with another popular geisha singer, Katsutaro. She recorded her first song  Chakkiri bushi (Picking tea song) which became a hit. Composed by a poet Kitahara Hakushu to promoted an amusement park. She followed her debut up with another hit, "Tenryū Kudareba" (Down the Tenryū River, 1933), which saw her become a superstar. Due to the success of her budding music career she decided to retire from being a geisha to concentrate solely on her singing career. In around mid-1930s was called "Katsu-Ichi Jidai" or "Ichi-Katsu Jidai", when she and Katsutaro Kouta became big rival on song and kimono style and other fees, which sometimes caused problems.

Throughout the 1930s Ichimaru continued to record new songs and performed for Japanese troops at home and abroad. By the end of the decade her recording career had slowed down to a complete halt due to World War II. After the war in 1948 she began to record music again boost the morale of post-war Japan. Her first song on post-war is "Kurogami Romansu"(Romance of Black Hair). At the end of the 1940s she started her own radio program called "Mitsukoshi Calendar of Songs" which would continue to be a success for the next ten years. After the war Ichimaru became interested in United States culture, becoming greatly interested in jazz music. The result of this interest was the hit song "Shamisen Boogie Woogie", composed with jazz songwriter Ryoichi Hattori.  In 1950, she became the first Japanese singer after World War II to be invited to Hawaii to perform, along with Noboru Kirishima, Akiko Futaba and Masao Koga. This performance was followed by other international concerts. During this time Ichimaru was singing for kabuki, and composing her own ko-uta, a style that would later become known as "Ichimaru Air". She also had a brief role in the 1951 film Tokyo File 212. The appearance of television in Japan made Ichimaru an important guest for music programs. In 1968, with others singers from 1930s era, she regularly appeared on "Natsukashi no Utagoe"(Nostalgic Songs). She continue
to record song until 1985, her last song was " Showa Sanosa Bushi"(Sanosa Song of Showa). And continue appeared in television until she decided to retire in 1995.

Teaching career 
In 1984, Ichimaru founded the Edo Ko-uta Ichiju Society with the hopes of popularizing Edo ko-uta. She had an active role in training students in this style, and continued to teach well into 80s. She was also granted the title of Head Master of Nakamura School of Edo Ko-uta in 1960, due to her successful singing career and her support of the style.

Legacy 
Ichimaru died at the age of 90 in 1997, leaving a legacy of traditional folk music for modern day Japanese. Throughout her career she recorded two-hundred-seventy pieces of ha-uta, zokkyoku melodies and ko-uta, and won many prestigious awards including Geijutsusai Shorei Sho in 1970, Shiju Hoso (Imperial Order of the Purple Ribbon) in 1972 and Kun Yonto Zui-ho Sho (4th Imperial Order of the Sacred Treasure) in 1981.

Her legacy continues to live on in the form of a generous donation of kimono, obi and memorabilia by Mrs. Fumi Suzuki, a friend of Ichimaru, to the Art Gallery of Greater Victoria in Canada and also by donations given to the Iida Museum in Nagano.  The May–June 2003 issue of the magazine Arts of Asia contained a twenty-page article about Ichimaru, which included an eight-page spread dedicated to some of her kimono.

References

Further reading 
 Barry Till, Michiko Wargentyne and Judith Patt. "From Geisha to Diva. The Kimono of Ichimaru" pp. 56–75. (May–June 2003). Arts of Asia.

1906 births
1997 deaths
20th-century Japanese composers
20th-century Japanese women singers
20th-century Japanese singers
20th-century women composers
Geishas
Japanese women composers
Musicians from Nagano Prefecture